Babice may refer to:

Czech Republic
 Babice (Hradec Králové District), a municipality and village in Hradec Králové Region
 Babice (Olomouc District), a municipality and village in Olomouc Region
 Babice (Prachatice District), a municipality and village in South Bohemian Region
 Babice (Prague-East District), a municipality and village in Central Bohemian Region
 Babice (Třebíč District), a municipality and village in Vysočina Region
 Babice (Uherské Hradiště District), a municipality and village in Zlín Region
 Babice nad Svitavou, a municipality and village in South Moravian Region
 Babice u Rosic, a municipality and village in South Moravian Region

Poland
 Babice, Lublin Voivodeship (east Poland)
 Babice, Łódź Voivodeship (central Poland)
 Babice, Chrzanów County in Lesser Poland Voivodeship (south Poland)
 Babice, Opole Voivodeship (south-west Poland)
 Babice, Oświęcim County in Lesser Poland Voivodeship (south Poland)
 Babice, Subcarpathian Voivodeship (south-east Poland)
 Babice, Masovian Voivodeship (east-central Poland)
 Babice, Silesian Voivodeship (south Poland)